National Identity Card of Nepal is a federal level Identity card with unique identity number for each person that can be obtained by citizens of Nepal, based on their biometric and demographic data. The data is collected by the National ID Card Management Centre (NIDMC), a statutory authority established in July 2011 by the government of Nepal, under the jurisdiction of Home ministry. The contract to process and deliver the cards was signed in 2018 with IDEMIA.

This card will feature a unique number, photo, personal Information and 10 fingerprints of the bearer. Upon full implementation, this card is to replace the current "Nepalese Citizenship" and it will be used for National Identity, personal identity, as Voter ID Card and as a Social Security Card through its unique number. This card will not replace other documents like Passport, Driver License.

On the first phase, government aims to distribute 110,000 cards in Rupandehi District of Province No. 5

See also

 Nepalese passport

References

National identification numbers
Government of Nepal
2001 establishments in Nepal